Go Chase Yourself is a 1938 American comedy film directed by Edward F. Cline and written by Paul Yawitz and Bert Granet. The film stars Joe Penner, Lucille Ball, Richard Lane, June Travis, Fritz Feld and Tom Kennedy. The film was released on April 22, 1938, by RKO Pictures.

Plot
A milquetoast bank clerk finds himself stuck in a speeding trailer towed by gangsters after a bank robbery goes awry. Unfortunately for him, the police and even his own domineering wife believe that he is the robber and so head off in hot pursuit, precipitating a fast-paced merry chase.

Cast 
 Joe Penner as Wilbur Meeley
 Lucille Ball as Carol Meeley
 Richard Lane as Nails
 June Travis as Judy Daniels
 Fritz Feld as Count Pierre Fountaine de Louis-Louis
 Tom Kennedy as Icebox
 Granville Bates as Halliday
 Bradley Page as Frank
 George Irving as Mr. Daniels
 Arthur Stone as Warden
 Jack Carson as Warren Miles
 Frank M. Thomas as Police Chief

References

External links 
 
 
 
 

1938 films
American black-and-white films
RKO Pictures films
Films directed by Edward F. Cline
1938 comedy films
American comedy films
1930s English-language films
1930s American films